Xyliphius melanopterus is a species of banjo catfish found in Ecuador, Peru and Venezuela where it occurs in the upper Amazon and Orinoco River basins.  It grows to a length of 14.7 cm.

References 
 

Aspredinidae
Catfish of South America
Freshwater fish of Ecuador
Freshwater fish of Peru
Fish of Venezuela
Fish of the Amazon basin
Fish described in 1962